Yu Chun-ok (born 15 August 1969) is a South Korean athlete. She competed in the women's javelin throw at the 1988 Summer Olympics.

References

1969 births
Living people
Athletes (track and field) at the 1988 Summer Olympics
South Korean female javelin throwers
Olympic athletes of South Korea
Place of birth missing (living people)